Pradip Chatterjee is a founder member of the Bengali band Moheener Ghoraguli. He is the younger brother of Gautam Chatterjee. He was also a theatre person, filmmaker and ethnographer.

Also known as Bula, Chatterjee is a flautist and vocalist.

Career

An engineering graduate from the Indian Institute of Engineering Science and Technology, Shibpur, which was then affiliated with the University of Calcutta, he joined the Calcutta engineering firm M.N. Dastur & Company (P) Ltd, after the break-up of Moheener Ghoraguli.

He resides in Kolkata, with his wife Sharmistha, daughter Anka and son Ritoban.

Discography

Moheener Ghoraguli albums

Shangbigno Pakhikul O Kolkata Bishayak (1977)
Ajaana UDonto bostu ba Aw-Oo-Baw (1978)
Drishyomaan Moheener Ghoraguli (1979)

References

External links

 Moheener Ghoraguli homepage

Chattopadhyay, Pradip
Moheener Ghoraguli members
Living people
University of Calcutta alumni
Year of birth missing (living people)
Place of birth missing (living people)
Musicians from Kolkata
Indian rock guitarists